Cuba is a country comprising the island of Cuba as well as Isla de la Juventud and several minor archipelagos. The Cuban state claims to adhere to socialist principles in organizing its largely state-controlled planned economy. Most of the means of production are owned and run by the government and most of the labor force is employed by the state. Recent years have seen a trend toward more private sector employment. By 2006, public sector employment was 78% and private sector 22%, compared to 91.8% to 8.2% in 1981. Currently, most companies in Cuba are owned wholly or partially by the Cuban state.

Notable firms 
This list includes notable companies with primary headquarters located in the country. The industry and sector follow the Industry Classification Benchmark taxonomy. Organizations which have ceased operations are included and noted as defunct.

References 

 
Cuba